North Tippah Creek is a stream in the U.S. state of Mississippi. It joins with South Tippah Creek to form the Tippah River.

Tippah is a name derived from the Choctaw language purported to mean "to eat one another", i.e. cannibalism. A variant name is "Tippah Creek".

References

Rivers of Mississippi
Rivers of Tippah County, Mississippi
Mississippi placenames of Native American origin